Mouse Fire is a U.S. independent dance-rock band from Tampa, Florida. They formed in 2006 and released their debut album Wooden Teeth in October 2007 to critical acclaim. The band took a brief hiatus from national touring to play locally and write/record their sophomore  full-length album, Big Emotion released in June 2010. Both records were released on Lujo Records.

History
Mouse Fire was formed in 2006 as a quartet comprising Joey Bruce, Shane Schuch, Aaron Venrick and Justin Carson who came out of several Florida bands. Joey Bruce met Shane Schuch in 1990s while Bruce was playing in Saga 24/7 and Schuch was playing with Atom Smashers Named Susie; Carson is a cousin of Bruce and Venrick knew Bruce at high school.
Their album Wooden Teeth was released  in November 2007 by Lujo Records. Stewart Mason writing in AllMusic described it as "a solid, encouraging debut."

Joey Bruce, the lead singer, left the band in February 2008 to focus on family and other projects and Shane Schuch took over the singing and continued to write new songs. 
The band released their second album Big Emotion in June 2010. The new album was described by the Oklahoma Gazette as "a resolutely dance-floor-ready sound combining bristling funk backbeat, shimmying synth lines and big, harmonic vocal hooks that hark back to Hall & Oates, Air Supply and Chicago… graceful, pretty and foot-tapping."

Members
Current
Shane Schuch – lead vocals, lead guitar
Justin Cason – bass, backing vocals
Aaron Venrick – drums

Former
Joey Bruce – lead vocals, guitar (2006—2008)

Discography

Studio albums
2007: Wooden Teeth

2010: Big Emotion

References

External links
MouseFireMusic.com
LUJOrecords.com
RedLetterStudios.com

Musical groups from Florida
Musical groups established in 2006